Ivan Melendez (born January 24, 2000), nicknamed "The Hispanic Titanic", is an American professional baseball infielder for the Arizona Diamondbacks organization. He played college baseball for the Texas Longhorns, winning the Golden Spikes Award and Dick Howser Trophy in 2022.

Amateur career
Melendez grew up in El Paso, Texas, and attended Coronado High School. He spent two seasons playing college baseball at Odessa College, a junior college that competed in the National Junior College Athletic Association (NJCAA), as a third baseman. During Melendez's freshman season at Odessa, he batted .411 with 17 home runs, 70 runs batted in (RBIs), and a .896 slugging percentage. He was named third-team NJCAA Division I All-American. Melendez's sophomore season was cut short due to COVID-19. However, during the shortened season, Melendez batted .354 with seven doubles, three triples and four homers.

In 2021, Melendez committed to the University of Texas at Austin to continue his college baseball career with the Texas Longhorns as a redshirt sophomore. During Melendez's first season at Texas, he hit .319 with 13 doubles, 3 triples, 13 home runs, and 51 RBIs. Melendez hit the go-ahead home run against Mississippi State in the College World Series. Melendez also earned 2021 First-Team All Big 12 Conference honors and the All-Tournament team for the College World Series.

After being selected in the 16th round of the 2021 Major League Baseball draft by the Miami Marlins, Melendez chose to return to Texas for his junior year. In 2022, Melendez hit .387 with 96 hits, 94 RBIs, and 32 home runs, which broke Kyle Russell's school record and Kris Bryant's national home run record since the BBCOR bats were introduced in 2011. Melendez won Big 12 Player of the Year and also won first team all-Big 12. Nationally, Melendez won the Golden Spikes Award, Dick Howser Trophy, and Collegiate Baseball Newspaper player of the year. Melendez was also awarded American Baseball Coaches Association First Team All-American.

Professional career 
The Arizona Diamondbacks selected Melendez in the second round, with the 43rd overall selection, of the 2022 MLB draft.

References

External links

2000 births
Living people
American baseball players
Texas Longhorns baseball players
Junior college baseball players in the United States
Baseball players from Texas
Sportspeople from El Paso, Texas
All-American college baseball players